Office is a 2015 Hong Kong-Chinese musical comedy-drama film produced and directed by Johnnie To and starring Chow Yun-fat, Sylvia Chang, Eason Chan and Tang Wei. The film is an adaptation of the 2008 play Design for Living, which was created by and starred Chang. Office premiered at the 2015 Toronto International Film Festival and was theatrically released in China on 2 September 2015 and in Hong Kong in 3D on 24 September 2015.

Plot
Billion-dollar company Jones & Sunn is going public. Chairman Ho Chung-ping (Chow Yun-fat) has promised CEO Winnie Cheung (Sylvia Chang), who has been his mistress for more than twenty years, that she will become a major shareholder of the company. As the IPO team enters the company to audit its accounts, a series of inside stories starts to be revealed.

Lee Xiang (Wang Ziyi), a new hire at Jones & Sunn, brings with him youthful ideals and dreams. Within the neoliberal market, the logic of intrigue rules, complicated by entanglements of love-hate relationships, which weaves a power play and a pathos-laden tragedy inside the office.

Cast
Chow Yun-fat as Ho Chung-ping (何仲平)
Sylvia Chang as Winnie Cheung (張威)
Eason Chan as David Wong (王大偉)
Tang Wei as Sophie (蘇菲)
Wang Ziyi as Lee Xiang (李想)
Lang Yueting as Kat Ho (何琪琪)
Cheung Siu-fai as John Suen (孫強)
Tien Hsin as Ka-ling (嘉玲)
Timmy Hung as Howard (浩浩)
Stephanie Che as Ban-ban (班班)
Mickey Chu as Shum Hoi (沈凱)
Mimi Kung as Mrs. Ho (何太太)
Lo Hoi-pang as Jones & Sunn security guard

Critical reception
Office has received positive reviews. Manohla Dargis of The New York Times refers it as "One of the best-directed movies that you can see in New York right now". Ignatiy Vishnevetsky of The A.V. Club gave the film a score of B+ praising the film as dazzling and highlighting director Johnnie To's cutting movement and stunningly composed figures. Tom Huddleston of Time Out gave the film a score of 5 out of 5 stars praising its stylish dance and song sequences, catchy lyrics and its screenplay by Sylvia Chang as a keenly observed, spiky treatise on office politics.

James Marsh of Twitch Film gave the film a mixed review praising the imagination that the staging captures, but criticising the lack of development of Hong Kong's working development and director To's lack of vision and clear intent. Clarence Tsui of The Hollywood Reporter praises the film's lavish decorations and technical accomplishments, but criticizes its simplistic screenplay and being unfocused, with little development of the relationships between the characters.

Awards and nominations

References

External links
 Office

2015 films
2015 3D films
2010s musical comedy-drama films
Hong Kong comedy-drama films
Hong Kong 3D films
2010s Cantonese-language films
Films directed by Johnnie To
Films based on musicals
Media Asia films
Milkyway Image films
Films set in 2008 
Films set in Hong Kong
Films shot in Hong Kong
Chinese musical comedy-drama films
Chinese 3D films
2015 comedy films
2015 drama films
2010s Mandarin-language films
2010s Hong Kong films